The following is a list of episodes for Digimon Fusion (known in Japan as Digimon Xros Wars), which is the sixth anime television series in Toei Animation's Digimon franchise. The series aired in Japan on TV Asahi between July 6, 2010 and March 21, 2012. The series was licensed in North America by Saban Brands. The series began airing on Nickelodeon on September 7, 2013, and later moved to Nicktoons on October 13, 2013 after the first three episodes. Reruns would begin airing on The CW's Vortexx block on January 25, 2014.

Series overview

Episode list
Season 1

Season 2

Season 3

References

Digimon Fusion
Fusion